Abedo is a paramilitary commander operating in Helmand Province, Afghanistan. She started out fighting at the side of her Mujahideen husband in 1979 when the Soviet Union invaded Afghanistan. After the death of her husband in 1987, she continued fighting commanding 200 Mujahideen fighters. After the withdrawal of Soviet forces in 1989, Abedo took to a life of peace. But when the Taliban set fire to her shop she formed a small militia to keep peace in her region of Helmand Province.

Notes 

Living people
Mujahideen members of the Soviet–Afghan War
Afghan Muslims
Year of birth missing (living people)